The Federal Correctional Institution, Williamsburg (FCI Williamsburg) is a medium-security United States federal prison for male inmates in Salters, South Carolina. It is run by the Federal Bureau of Prisons, a division of the United States Department of Justice.  It has an adjacent prison camp for minimum-security male offenders.

FCI Williamsburg is located in the town of Salters 90 miles southeast of Columbia, the state capital.

Notable events
On October 27, 2010, US Attorney General Eric Holder presented an Outstanding Contribution Award to Henry R. Mills, an Air Conditioning Equipment Mechanical Supervisor at FCI Williamsburg. Mills developed more efficient means of cooling 18 ice machines in use at the facility, lessening their environmental impact via a reduction of more than 2.5 million gallons of water annually. This resulted in a savings of more than $100,000 in Bureau of Prisons funds.

Notable inmates

See also

List of U.S. federal prisons
Federal Bureau of Prisons
Incarceration in the United States

References

Buildings and structures in Williamsburg County, South Carolina
Williamsburg
Williamsburg